The 1998–99 Indiana Hoosiers men's basketball team represented Indiana University. Their head coach was Bobby Knight, who was in his 28th year. The team played its home games in  Assembly Hall in Bloomington, Indiana, and was a member of the Big Ten Conference.

The Hoosiers finished the regular season with an overall record of 23–11 and a conference record of 9–7, finishing 2nd in the Big Ten Conference. After losing to the Fighting Illini in the quarterfinals of the Big Ten tournament, the Hoosiers were invited to dance in the 1999 NCAA tournament. However, IU lost in the second round to St. John's, who advanced to the Elite Eight.

Roster

Schedule/Results

|-
!colspan=8| Regular Season
|-

|-
!colspan=8| Big Ten tournament

|-
!colspan=8| NCAA tournament

References

External links

Indiana Hoosiers men's basketball seasons
Indiana
Indiana
1998 in sports in Indiana
1999 in sports in Indiana